Prem Prakash Modi (born 17 July 1968) is an Indian film director, writer and actor.

Modi made his debut as a director in 2013 with a Bengali feature film Arjun – Kalimpong E Sitaharan starring Sabyasachi Chakrabarty, Om, Manoj Mitra, Churni Ganguly and Biswajit Chakrabarty, based on Samaresh Majumdar's novel Khunkharapi and Kalimpong e Sitaharan. His next directorial venture was Panchlait (2017), which was well received by the audiences. He has worked as an Assistant Director for noted directors such as Ranjit Kapoor, Gul Bahar Singh, Aparna Sen, Anjan Dutt, Anjan Das, Suman Mukhopadhyay and others since 1997.

Early life 
Prem Modi or Prem Prakash Modi was born on 17 July in the village Nunihat (Nonihat), Jharkhand, India. His father, Parmeshwar Lal Modi, was a small businessman in the village. There was no television set and the nearest theater was 32 km away in Dumka. He was educated at the Church School Beldih, Jamshedpur and Bhagalpur University.

Career 
After graduation, Modi moved to Kolkata. His is first job was at Howrah Gases Ltd as an accounts assistant. Due to his keen interest in acting from childhood, he joined a theater group, and after a few years, he quit his job and started working as a full-time professional actor in films, television and theaters. In 1999 he moved behind the camera and began assisting directors such as Gul Bahar Singh, Anjan Das, Suman Mukhopadhyay, Anjan Dutt, Aparna Sen etc.
 

Prem began his career as a chief assistant director for The Goal, a Children's Film Society (CFSI) production which starred Irrfan Khan and was directed by Gul Bahar Singh; the film won the Best Children's Film at 47th National Film Awards – India, the Special International Jury Prize at 11th Cairo International Film Festival – Egypt and Special Mention at International Federation of Film Societies in the Czech Republic. Modi was the Chief AD for  the film Chaturanga directed by Suman Mukhopadhya, which was entered in the Montreal World Film Festival. He was again the Chief AD for the film Iti Mrinalini, directed by Aparna Sen, which was nationally and internationally acclaimed. He has also worked with Samir Mehanovic, a BAFTA award winner for the film Mouth of Hell ("Anant"). He was the creative adviser and coordinator for the American Reality Show The Amazing Race and a Brazilian television show The Embarcados ("On a Boat").

Modi wrote the story and lyrics for the film Sixer a CFSI production starring Amrish Puri, directed by Gul Bahar Singh. He wrote dialogues for Abhishek Bachchan for the film Antarmahal, directed by Rituparno Ghosh.

Modi has directed more than 300 episodes of non-fictional musical series for DD1 (Doordarshan) and DD7 television channels, and directed a fictional series titled Mukti for Doordarshan. He has also directed documentaries, corporate and promotional films for the Government of India. 

He made is directorial debut with Arjun – Kalimpong E Sitaharan starring Sabyasachi Chakrabarty, Om, Manoj Mitra, Churni Ganguly. His next release was Panchlait, starring Amitosh Nagpal, Anuradha Mukherjee, Yashpal Sharma, Rajesh Sharma, Ravi Jhankal and Brijendra Kala in lead roles. The film got acclaim from both the audiences and was part of prestigious film festivals including the International Film Festival of India. He has also co-produced a Hindi feature film Ateet starring Rajeev Khandelwal, Priyamani and Sanjay Suri, streaming on ZEE5.

Awards and honors 

Panchlait - Official Selection in 49th International Film Festival of India (IFFI)
Panchlait awarded as best Inspiring Film in 2nd Haryana International Film Festival.
Panchlait awarded as best Art Film in Jharkhand International Film Festival.
Best Inspiring Director in 2nd Haryana International Film Festival for Panchlait.
Samaj Ratna for Panchlait from Honorable Governor of Bihar in 2018. 
 Best Actor award for theater from The Government of West Bengal in 1995.

Filmography

Television

References

External links

 

Film directors from Jharkhand
Indian male screenwriters
Indian male film actors
Living people
Male actors from Jharkhand
Screenwriters from Jharkhand
1968 births
Indian television directors
Bengali film directors
Bengali male television actors
Male actors in Hindi television
Indian male television actors
20th-century Indian male actors
21st-century Indian male actors
Indian film directors
Hindi-language film directors
Film directors from Kolkata
Tilka Manjhi Bhagalpur University alumni